The Adventures of Hijitus is an Argentine animated series created in 1967 by Spanish cartoonist Manuel García Ferré. It was the first animated series in Latin America intended for television market, and has been considered the most successful series in the history of Latin American cartoons.

The series was first broadcast on August 7, 1967, by the Canal 13, in the form of firmware daily 1 minute in length, which was repeated throughout the day at different times, then coming to the cinema in film format.

The strip stars Hijitus, a street child who lives in a sanitary sewer in the city of Trulalá that is ravaged by the actions of Professor Neurus, among others. To defend Trulalá and his friends (Oaky, Pichichus, Anteojito and Larguirucho), Hijitus transforms himself into Super Hijitus, a superhero with great strength, capable of flying.

Series overview

Pilot (1966)

Season 1 (1967–68)

Season 2 (1968–69)

Season 3 (1969–70)

Season 4 (1970–71)

Season 5 (1971–72)

Season 6 (1972)

Season 7 (1995–96)

Season 8 (1996) 

Lists of Argentine television series episodes